Possession is a 1981 psychological drama and horror film directed by Andrzej Żuławski and written by Żuławski and Frederic Tuten. The plot obliquely follows the relationship between an international spy (Sam Neill) and his wife (Isabelle Adjani), who begins exhibiting increasingly disturbing behavior after asking for a divorce.

Possession, an international co-production between France and West Germany, was filmed in West Berlin in 1980. Żuławski's only English-language film, it premiered at the 34th Cannes Film Festival, where Adjani won the Best Actress award for her performance. The screenplay was written during the painful divorce of Żuławski with actress Malgorzata Braunek. While not commercially successful either in Europe or in the United States, with the latter only receiving a heavily edited cut on its initial release, the film eventually acquired cult status and has been more positively appraised in later years.

Plot 

Mark is a spy who returns home to West Berlin from a mysterious espionage mission to find that his wife, Anna, wants a divorce. She will not say why but insists it is not because she found someone else. Mark reluctantly turns the apartment and custody of their young son, Bob, over to her. After recovering from a destructive drinking spree, he visits the apartment to find Bob alone, unkempt, and neglected. When Anna returns, he stays with Bob, refusing to leave her alone with the child, but attempts to make amends. Anna leaves in the middle of the night.

Mark receives a phone call from Anna's lover, Heinrich, telling him that Anna is with him. The next day, Mark meets Bob's teacher, Helen; she inexplicably looks identical to Anna but with green eyes. Mark visits and fights Heinrich, who beats him. Mark then beats Anna at home, after which she flees. The next morning, they have another hysterical argument during which they both cut themselves with an electric knife, Anna on the throat and Mark on the arm.

Mark hires a private investigator to follow Anna and discovers that she has been keeping a second flat in a derelict apartment building. When the investigator discovers a bizarre tentacled creature in the bathroom, Anna kills him with a broken bottle. The lover of the now-dead detective, Zimmerman, goes to the flat himself, where he finds the creature and his lover's dead body. Anna beats Zimmerman in a rage before stealing his gun and then shooting him to death.

Anna continues her erratic behavior and recounts to Mark a violent miscarriage she suffered in the subway while he was gone. She claims it resulted in a nervous breakdown; during the miscarriage, she oozed blood and fluids from her orifices. Heinrich visits Anna at the second apartment and is shocked to discover the creature in the bedroom, as well as a collection of dismembered body parts in her refrigerator. She attacks him and Heinrich flees, bleeding.

Heinrich calls Mark and begs him to pick him up. Mark stops by Anna's apartment first and discovers the body parts; the creature, however, is gone. Mark meets Heinrich at the bar where he murders him, but stages it as an accidental death in the bathroom stall. He then sets Anna's apartment on fire before fleeing on Heinrich's motorcycle. At home, he finds Anna's friend Margie on the point of death as she emerges from the lift, bleeding from knife wounds. She dies; he drags the body inside where Anna greets him, and the two have sex in the kitchen. Afterward, he makes plans to cover up Margie's death. He then discovers Anna having sex with the creature. Heinrich's mother phones Mark asking about her son. When he goes to meet with her, she commits suicide by taking several pills.

The next day, as Mark wanders the street, his former business associates pressure him to rejoin them. He is evasive and returns to Margie's apartment to find it surrounded by police and his former employers. He stages a distraction, allowing someone to sneak away in his car, but he is wounded in the ensuing shootout. Fleeing on the motorbike, he has a horrific accident and races into a building where he is pursued by Anna, the police, and his business associates. Anna reveals the creature, now fully formed as Mark's doppelgänger. Mark raises his gun to shoot it but he and Anna are gunned down by a hail of bullets from the police below. Bloodied and dying, Anna lies atop Mark and uses his gun to shoot herself. She dies in his arms and he jumps to his death through the stairwell. The doppelgänger flees through the roof.

Later, Helen is at the flat babysitting Bob when the doorbell rings. Bob implores her not to open the door, but Helen ignores him. From outside, the sound of sirens, planes, and explosions fill the air. Bob races through the flat into the bathroom, where he floats in the bathtub face-down, drowning himself. The silhouette of Mark's doppelgänger is seen from the frosted glass door. Helen stares, her eyes shining.

Cast

Themes
Trying to classify Possession, critics drew parallels with Roman Polanski's Repulsion and David Cronenberg's The Brood. Despite being referred to as a psychological drama and psychological horror, the genre of the film is still a matter of controversy. As J. Hoberman notes:

A number of critics deny the creature with tentacles exists within physical reality: it may be a reflection of Anna's psychosis; the product of Mark's inflamed consciousness, unable to accept his wife's betrayal; or a kind of revenge of the director traumatized by his own divorce from his ex-wife.

Many writers about Possession have paid attention to the motif of doppelgänger throughout the film. Both spouses die, but they are replaced by doubles, ideal models of husband and wife. Anna "grows" a double of Mark from the creature, an indefatigable lover who is always by her side. The real Mark finds a copy of Anna in the person of the school teacher Helen – she is a gentle character and does not demand anything from Mark, being an "ideal housewife".

Sociopolitical context 

As in the case of The Devil, the director placed political subtext under the layer of expressive horror after deliberately choosing Berlin as it was the least remote point from Poland and other countries of the European socialist bloc. The plot of Possession is not limited to an autobiographical description of a difficult breakup, separation and marital disintegration in family relations – at that time Żuławski also experienced a final separation from Poland. Two houses in the film – the modern one, which is Mark and Anna's apartment, and the old abandoned house in Kreuzberg, where Anna hides the squid-like creature – are located next to the Wall. The film contains elements of a spy thriller. Mark, an intelligence agent, leaves his job for his family. Anna leaves her family to become an "agent of the dark forces". The confrontation ends with death for both, and in the last frames of the film, there is a direct allusion (the sounds of sirens and the rumble of explosions) to the armed conflict that began in the city divided in two, which could end in a nuclear apocalypse.

Scholar Bartłomiej Paszylk writes that the metaphors present in the film also represent "a disintegrating country. The very fact that the film takes place in Cold War-era West Berlin is quite significant for the metaphor of divorce—the wall that separates it from East Berlin being a symbol of disconnection of what was once united—but [Żuławski's] additional intention might have been for the Berlin wall to symbolize the Iron Curtain, and for Germany to symbolize Poland, a country he had to leave in order to keep making movies."

Production 
Żuławski approached Danièle Thompson and asked if she would work on a film. After receiving a script about 20 pages long, Thompson suggested Frederic Tuten; thus, Żuławski went to New York to meet him. They worked on the script for the film in New York and Paris while Żuławski was in a state of deep depression. In 1976, he divorced actress Malgorzata Braunek. Żuławski recalled how he once returned home late in the evening and found his five-year-old son Xavier alone in the apartment, smeared with jam, after his wife left him alone for several hours – this scene was directly reflected in Possession. A year and a half later, following the authorities' halting of work on the film On the Silver Globe in 1978, the director faced a de facto ban and was forced to leave Poland. While emigrating, he did not give up on suicidal thoughts, which he had initially been able to get rid of by starting to work on a new film.

Żuławski and the film's producer, Marie-Laure Reyre, immediately chose Isabelle Adjani as Anna. By this time, Adjani had already become a celebrity, but the producers had reasons to expect that she would accept the offer. After an unsuccessful attempt to start a career in Hollywood (released in 1978, Walter Hill's The Driver failed at the box office), Adjani decided to return to European cinema. She starred in Nosferatu the Vampyre (1979), but it had not yet been possible to repeat her success in being nominated for the Academy Award for her role in The Story of Adele H. (1975). However, Adjani's management company turned down the offer, and the filmmakers chose the next candidate Judy Davis, whose work in the film My Brilliant Career (1979) impressed Żuławski. Sam Neill, a less well-known actor who appeared with Davis in the same film, was chosen for the role of Mark. Davis was hesitating over whether to take the role, so Adjani eventually accepted the offer.

The role was emotionally exhausting for Adjani. In one of the interviews, she stated that it took her several years to recover from her performance, which J. Hoberman called "a veritable aria of hysteria". It was rumored that she attempted suicide after filming completed, which was confirmed by Żuławski. Time Out magazine compared the behavior of her character to the actions of "a dervish of unrestrained emotion and pure sexual terror".

Sam Neill has also commented on the rigours of filming: "I call it the most extreme film I've ever made, in every possible respect, and he asked of us things I wouldn't and couldn't go to now. And I think I only just escaped that film with my sanity barely intact."

The budget for Possession was $2.4 million, and a 12-week shoot was scheduled. The director chose Berlin as the setting for the story because of its proximity to the Communist world. Principal photography began on 7 July 1980 in West Berlin, and most of the film was shot next to the Wall, in the Kreuzberg section of West Berlin. The "surrealist, clean quality" Żuławski wanted for the film was aided by the Steadicam work of camera operator Andrzej J. Jaroszewicz and Bruno Nuytten's cinematography and lighting. Carlo Rambaldi, a famed Italian special effects artist and the creator of the Alien animatronic head, assisted in creating the tentacle creature featured in the film.

Release
Possession had its worldwide premiere at the 34th Cannes Film Festival, and was released in France on 27 May 1981. After an initial limited theatre release in the United Kingdom, the film was banned as one of the notorious "video nasties". On American screens, it came out in a heavily edited 81-minute cut version from Limelight International Films on the eve of Halloween 1983, having lost more than a third of its runtime; the distributor turned Possession into an eccentric body horror, almost completely eliminating the main theme of the painful breakdown of marriage. This version was ridiculed by the American press as an example of "a cheap Grand Guignol" and had no public success.

A new 4K restoration of the film by Metrograph premiered in United States at Fantastic Fest in September 2021 and expanded nationwide on October 15.

Box office
Possession had a modest total of 541,120 admissions in France. In the United States, it was released on 28 October 1983 and grossed $1.1 million at the box office.

Home media
Although the film was banned from distribution in the United Kingdom, it was later released uncut on VHS and DVD in 2000 by Anchor Bay Entertainment. In 2014, Mondo Vision released a region-free Blu-ray of the film featuring the uncut version. This release was available in a standard special edition, as well as a limited edition numbered to 2,000 units.

Reception

Critical reception
Possession received lukewarm critical response when it was initially released in the summer of 1981. Derek Malcolm of The Guardian stated that, while Żuławski displayed talent and the special effects were unforgettable, the film itself was far too serious for its own good. Dennis Schwartz from Ozus' World Movie Reviews gave the film a grade of "C+", calling it "[an] uncompromising demented cult oddity". Leonard Maltin wrote of the film: "Adjani 'creates' a monster, to the consternation of husband Neill, lover Bennent—and the viewer", ultimately deeming the film a "confusing drama of murder, horror, intrigue, though it's all attractively directed". Vincent Canby of The New York Times wrote, "At times, the living-color Possession recalls Roman Polanski's black-and-white Repulsion, though only because Miss Adjani is required to slice up as many male victims as Catherine Deneuve did in the earlier, far better film."

Variety gave the film a positive review, praising Żuławski's direction, symbolism, and pacing, writing "mass of symbols and unbridled, brilliant directing meld this disparate tale into a film that could get cult following on its many levels of symbolism and exploitation".

Harry Haun of the New York Daily News alternately panned the film, awarding it one-and-a-half out of four stars and writing that Adjani's "prize-winning mad-act is impossible to appraise because the film it's in is outlandishly unhinged as well... Just about any dialogue accompanying this mess would seem ludicrous". The Philadelphia Daily Newss Joe Baltake deemed the film a "boringly camp-elegante attempt by a group of reputable French, German and Polish filmmakers" and assessed Adjani's performance as "babbling, incoherent yet arresting". In his review, however, Baltake conceded that the truncated version of the film he had seen—cut by approximately 50 minutes—may have contributed to the film's incoherency.

Legacy
In the years following its release, Possession accrued a cult following. Film scholar Bartłomiej Paszylk deemed it "one of the most enigmatic and uncompromising horror movies in the history of cinema". Writer Kim Newman considers Possession to be a "kitsch film", noting: "Zulawski takes his film too seriously, but it's fun all the same ... [he] goes mad with his swooping camera, has everything in shot painted in blue and encourages his stars to attack their roles with a kind of stylised hysteria rare outside Japanese theatre." Newman also likened elements of Adjani's character to that of Samantha Eggar in The Brood (1979). Tom Huddleston of Time Out gave the perfect-star rating, and wrote "There are plenty of movies which seem to have been made by madmen. Possession may be the only film in existence which is itself mad: unpredictable, horrific, its moments of terrifying lucidity only serving to highlight the staggering derangement at its core. Extreme but essential viewing." Similarly, Slant Magazines Budd Wilkins gave the film 4/4 stars, saying that "Many directors have taken full advantage of Adjani's exotic, ethereal French beauty; only Zulawski saw beyond the exquisite surface to something unsettling. Most disconcerting is the way Adjani can register almost demonic ill-intent while never losing some trace of the alluring." Ben Sachs from Chicago Reader called it a "confounding masterpiece".

Michael Brooke of Sight & Sound commented in 2011, "Although it's easy to see why it was pigeonholed as a horror film, its first half presents what is still one of the most viscerally vivid portraits of a disintegrating relationship yet committed to film, comfortably rivalling Lars von Trier's Antichrist, David Cronenberg's The Brood and Ingmar Bergman's Scenes from a Marriage." Reviewing the Blu-ray release of the film in 2013, Michael Dodd of Bring The Noise was similarly impressed with what he called "an intense exploration of marital breakdown". He argued that this made Possession "one of the few horror films that successfully builds a back story for its main characters". Reviewing the film's Blu-ray release, Andrew Pollard of the British magazine Starburst rated the film eight out of ten stars, calling it "a visceral, violent, erratic and piercing effort that pokes and prods its audience any chance it gets"; Pollard would also praise the performances of Adjani and Neill, practical effects and unsettling tone. In his review of the 4K restoration, David Fear of Rolling Stone lauded the film as "a body-horror answer to Kramer vs. Kramer" and stated that the restoration was "jaw-droppingly beautiful".

On the review aggregator website Rotten Tomatoes, 86% of 35 critic reviews are positive for Possession, and the average rating is 8.1 out of 10. Its consensus reads, "Blending genres as effectively as it subverts expectations, Possession uses powerful acting and disquieting imagery to grapple with complex themes." On Metacritic, the film earned a weighted average score of 75 out of 100, based on 10 reviews, signifying "generally favorable reviews".

Awards and nominations

Notes

References

Sources

External links 
 
 
 
 

1981 films
1981 drama films
1981 horror films
1980s English-language films
1980s French films
1980s German films
1980s horror drama films
1980s psychological drama films
1980s psychological horror films
English-language French films
English-language German films
Films directed by Andrzej Żuławski
Films featuring a Best Actress César Award-winning performance
Films set in apartment buildings
Films set in Berlin
Films set in West Germany
French horror drama films
French psychological drama films
French psychological horror films
German psychological drama films
Body horror films
Video nasties
West German films